State Road 20, is an IB-class road in northern and western Serbia, connecting Sremska Mitrovica with Bosnia and Herzegovina at Badovinci. It is located in Vojvodina and Šumadija and Western Serbia regions.

Before the new road categorization regulation given in 2013, the route wore the following names: P 103.2, P 116, P 208a and P 209a (before 2012) / 125 (after 2012).

The existing route is a main road with two traffic lanes. By the valid Space Plan of Republic of Serbia the road is not planned for upgrading to motorway, and is expected to be conditioned in its current state.

Sections

See also 
 Roads in Serbia

References

External links 
 Official website – Roads of Serbia (Putevi Srbije)
 Official website – Corridors of Serbia (Koridori Srbije) (Serbian)

State roads in Serbia